Noluvuyo Tafeni, known as Luvuyo Tafeni, is a South African politician. A member of the Economic Freedom Fighters party, she has been a Member of the National Assembly since October 2019.

Parliamentary career 
Tafeni is a member of the Economic Freedom Fighters. On 25 October 2019, Tafeni was sworn in as a Member of the National Assembly. She replaced Mmabatho Mokause, who had resigned.

On 6 May 2020, she became an Alternate Member of the  Portfolio Committee on Justice and Correctional Services. She served on the committee until 4 September 2020.

References

External links 

 Profile at Parliament of South Africa

Living people
Year of birth missing (living people)
Economic Freedom Fighters politicians
Members of the National Assembly of South Africa
Women members of the National Assembly of South Africa
21st-century South African women politicians
21st-century South African politicians